Foca was the name of at least two ships of the Italian Navy and may refer to:

 , a submarine launched in 1908 and discarded in 1918.
 , a  launched in 1937 and sunk in 1940.

Italian Navy ship names